Reda Benhadj Djillali (born May 31, 1978 in El Attaf) is an Algerian football player. He currently plays for Algerian Ligue Professionnelle 1 club CS Constantine.

Club career
On September 10, 2011, Benhadj Djillali made his debut for CS Constantine as a 73rd-minute substitute in the opening round of the 2011–12 Algerian Ligue Professionnelle 1 against JSM Béjaïa. A week later, he scored his first goal for the club in a 3-1 loss to ASO Chlef.

On January 3, 2012, Benhadj Djillali was loaned out to Saudi Arabian club Najran SC until the end of the season.

Honours
 Won the Algerian Championnat National once with JS Kabylie in 2006

References

External links
 DZFoot Profile
 

1978 births
Algerian footballers
Algerian expatriate footballers
Algerian expatriate sportspeople in Saudi Arabia
Algerian Ligue Professionnelle 1 players
ASO Chlef players
CS Constantine players
Expatriate footballers in Saudi Arabia
JS Kabylie players
Living people
MC El Eulma players
Najran SC players
OMR El Annasser players
People from El Attaf
RC Kouba players
USM Annaba players
USM Blida players
Association football midfielders
21st-century Algerian people